The Tawa gecko (Gekko tawaensis) is a species of gecko. It is endemic to Japan.

References

Gekko
Reptiles described in 1956
Endemic reptiles of Japan